Gypsy Blood is a British feature-length observational documentary which examines the fighting culture that Romani fathers hand on to their sons.
It was filmed over two years by the photographer Leo Maguire and produced by the production company ClearStory.

Subject
Its main subjects are Hughie Doherty, who becomes embroiled in a fight to defend his family’s name, and his young son Francie, who is portrayed living between two worlds, shown learning to read at primary school while sparring and hunting at the travellers’ campsite.  
The film also follows the story of Fred Butcher, a Romany who nearly dies during a machete attack after a day of drinking in the pub turns to violence.

Reception
Transmitted on 19 January 2012, Gypsy Blood launched 2012’s season of the True Stories documentary strand on Channel 4 and was the first True Stories to premiere on the main channel, rather than the digital channel More4.  It attracted more than double the average audience for Channel 4’s 10pm slot - 2.01 million (13.1% share) between 10pm and 11.35pm and an additional 280,800 watched on C4+1.

Controversy
The film attracted critical praise from newspapers but also drew 500 complaints to Ofcom, including a complaint from the RSPCA, about scenes of alleged animal cruelty perpetrated by some of the film’s characters.  In March 2012 Ofcom dropped these complaints, stating they did not raise issues that warranted investigation.

Awards
Gypsy Blood was shortlisted for the Rockies awards at the 2012 Banff World Media Festival, in the Social and Humanitarian documentaries category. The film was shortlisted in the Best Newcomer category of the 2012 Grierson Awards.
Leo Maguire was shortlisted for Cinematography on Gypsy Blood at the 2012 Bafta Craft Awards. 
Gypsy Blood was showcased at the 2012 Sheffield documentary festival.

References

Further reading
 "TV review: Gypsy Blood: True Stories" Times Higher Education
 "True Stories: Gypsy Blood" Mirror online
 "Channel 4: Gypsy Blood"

External links 
 

2012 television films
2012 films
British television documentaries
Documentary films about Romani people
Romani in the United Kingdom
2012 documentary films
2010s British films